Herpomyces is a fungal genus in the order Herpomycetales (Laboulbeniomycetes), with species that are exclusively ectoparasites of members of the Blattodea order (cockroaches). As of 2020, 27 species of Herpomyces are formally described. Members of Herpomyces have been reported from all continents except Antarctica.

See also
 Laboulbeniomycetes

References

External links
A. Glenn Richards, Myrtle N. Smith; Infection of Cockroaches with Herpomyces (Laboulbeniales) II. Histology and Histopathology, . Ann Entomol Soc Am 2014; 49 (1): 85–93. doi: 10.1093/aesa/49.1.85

Laboulbeniales